Dominik Mader (born 19 April 1989 in Göppingen) is a German footballer who plays for Türkischer SV Donzdorf.

Career
Mader made his debut on the professional league level in the 2. Bundesliga for TuS Koblenz on 29 October 2008, when he started a game against TSV 1860 München.

References

External links
 

1989 births
Living people
German footballers
TuS Koblenz players
2. Bundesliga players
Association football midfielders
VfL Kirchheim/Teck players
People from Göppingen
Sportspeople from Stuttgart (region)
Footballers from Baden-Württemberg